Leda Maria Cozer Abreu (born 16 April 1966) is a former Brazilian football player.

She was part of the Brazil women's national football team at the 1995 South American Women's Football Championship and played in two matches at the 1995 FIFA Women's World Cup in Sweden. She was named as an alternate at the 1996 Summer Olympics, but did not participate.

See also
 Brazil at the 1996 Summer Olympics

References

External links
 
 
http://www.soccerpunter.com/players/291517-Leda-Maria-Cozer-Abreu

1966 births
Living people
Brazilian women's footballers
Place of birth missing (living people)
Footballers at the 1996 Summer Olympics
Olympic footballers of Brazil
1995 FIFA Women's World Cup players
Brazil women's international footballers
Women's association football midfielders